This is a list of films which ranked number one at the weekend box office for the year 2022.

Box office records 

 Doctor Strange in the Multiverse of Madness (2022) release in Pakistan 3 days after Eid al-Fitr when five local films already running in theaters from first day of Eid but still manage to surpassed them all at the weekend box office, this angered local producers and they demanded a ban on foreign films but the fans reaction on social media block off the protest as the audience was more interested in watching Doctor Strange.
 The film earned PKR 70 million in Pakistan in its opening weekend. Its debut set the following records: best opening of 2022, second biggest opening since Covid-19 (after No Way Home), Fourth best opening for an MCU film.
 Doctor Strange in the Multiverse of Madness later crossed 200 million milestone in Pakistan becoming the second film to do so during the pandemic era after Spider-Man: No Way Home (2021).
 In July, the film gross more than 230 million becoming the highest-grossing film of 2022 (until it was surpassed by London Nahi Jaunga (2022)), Sixteenth highest-grossing film of all time in Pakistan and 3rd highest grossing MCU film in Pakistan after No Way Home and Avengers: Endgame (2019).
 Top Gun: Maverick (2022) records the second biggest opening for a Tom Cruise film in Pakistan after Mission Impossible: Fallout.(2018)
 Additionally, the film surpassed Mission: Impossible – Fallout to become Tom Cruise's highest-grossing film at the Pakistani box office.
 On 23 July, London Nahi Jaunga became the second film of 2022 and third film during the pandemic era to cross the 200 million mark in Pakistan. 
 On 27 July, the film surpassed Doctor Strange in the Multiverse of Madness (2022) to become the highest grossing film of 2022 at the Pakistani box office.
 The film records the biggest fourth weekend of 2022 in Pakistan grossing over 2.5 crore.
 The film grossed PKR 300 million at domestic box office and become the tenth highest-grossing film of all time in Pakistan.
 As of 30 July, Thor: Love and Thunder earned PKR 147.0 million in first three weeks of its release and become the 5th highest grossing MCU film in Pakistan.
 The film The Legend of Maula Jatt records the second biggest domestic box office opening in Pakistan and the biggest for a Pakistani film. The film opened on Friday and grossed 45 million ( including 17.5 million from Thursday night previews) the highest ever opening day in Pakistan. It then collected 34.5 million on Saturday and 33.5 million on Sunday the highest grossed Saturday and Sunday ever, taking its opening weekend total to 113.0 million domestically, surpassing Sultan and JPNA 2 to become the second highest domestic box office opening in Pakistan only behind Avengers: Endgame.(145.0 million).

Highest-grossing films 

This is the list of the top 15 highest grossing films at the Pakistani box office for the year 2022. For worldwide gross, see List of Pakistani films of 2022 and 2022 in film § Highest-grossing films

In-Year Release

Opening weekends 
The following list shows top highest-grossing opening weekends of 2022 in Pakistan, which include local and Foreign films. These figures are not adjusted for ticket prices inflation.

See also 

 List of highest-grossing films in Pakistan
 List of highest-grossing Pakistani films
 Lists of Pakistani films
 Cinema of Pakistan
 Lists of highest-grossing films

References 

Pakistan
2022_box_office_number-one_films_in_Pakistan